Notre Dame Preparatory High School is a private Catholic high school located in Scottsdale, Arizona, United States.

History
The site of the school was purchased by the Roman Catholic Diocese of Phoenix in March 2001.

The school opened in August 2002 with only a freshman and sophomore class.  The first class of 72 students graduated on May 21, 2005.

Demographics
The demographic breakdown of the 925 students enrolled for the 2017–2018 school year was:

Notable alumni

 Joe Anglim, contestant on Survivor (franchise) 
 Peter Bourjos, baseball player  
Kade Gottlieb, Gottmik, finalist on RuPaul's Drag Race (season 13)
 Jagger Jones, stock car racing driver 
 Sean Renfree, football player
 Tayler Scott, baseball player 
 Aaron Slegers, baseball player
 Jake Smith, American football player

References

External links
 
 The Diocese of Phoenix website
 NDP Live

Education in Scottsdale, Arizona
Educational institutions established in 2002
Catholic secondary schools in Arizona
Catholic Church in Arizona
Schools in Maricopa County, Arizona
2002 establishments in Arizona